Abraham ben Meir Ibn Ezra ( ʾAḇrāhām ben Mēʾīr ʾībən ʾĒzrāʾ, often abbreviated as ;  Ibrāhim al-Mājid ibn Ezra; also known as Abenezra or simply Ibn Ezra, 1089 / 1092 – 27 January 1164 / 23 January 1167) was one of the most distinguished Jewish biblical commentators and philosophers of the Middle Ages. He was born in Tudela, Taifa of Zaragoza and present-day Navarre.

Biography

Abraham Ibn Ezra was born in Tudela, one of the oldest and most important Jewish communities in the present-day Spanish region of Navarre. At the time, the town was under the Muslim rule of the emirs of Zaragoza. However, when he later moved to Córdoba, he claimed it to be his place of birth. Ultimately, most scholars agree that his place of birth was Tudela.

Little is known of Ibn Ezra's family from outside sources; however, he wrote of a marriage to a wife that produced five children. While it is believed four died early, the last-born, Isaac, became an influential poet and later convert to Islam in 1140. The conversion of his son was deeply troubling for Ibn Ezra, leading him to pen many poems reacting to the event for years afterward.

Ibn Ezra was a close friend of Judah Halevi, who was some 14 years older. When Ibn Ezra moved to Córdoba as a young man, Halevi followed him. This trend continued when the two began their lives as wanderers in 1137. Halevi died in 1141, but Ibn Ezra continued travelling for three decades, reaching as far as Baghdad. During his travels, he began to compose secular poetry describing the lands through which he was travelling as well as beginning to pen the deeply rational Torah commentaries he would be best remembered for.

Works 

In Spain, Ibn Ezra had already gained the reputation of a distinguished poet and thinker. However, apart from his poems, the vast majority of his work was composed after 1140. Written in Hebrew, as opposed to  earlier thinkers' use of Judeo-Arabic, these works covering Hebrew grammar, Biblical exegesis, and scientific theory were tinged with the work of Arab scholars he had studied in Spain.

Beginning many of his writings in Italy, Ibn Ezra also worked extensively to translate the works of grammarian and biblical exegetist Judah ben David Hayyuj from their original Judeo-Arabic to Hebrew. Published as early as 1140, these translations became some of the first expositions of Hebrew grammar to be written in Hebrew.

During his time of publishing translations, Ibn Ezra also began to publish his own biblical commentaries. Making use of many of the techniques outlined by Hayyuj, Ibn Ezra would publish his first biblical commentary, a commentary on Kohelet in 1140. He would continue to publish such commentaries over mostly works from Ketuvim and Nevi'im throughout his journey, though he would manage to publish a short commentary over the entire Pentateuch while living in Lucca in 1145. This short commentary would be amended into longer portions beginning in 1155 with the publication of his expanded commentary on Genesis.

Besides his commentaries on the Torah, Ibn Ezra would also publish a multitude of works on science in Hebrew. In doing so, he would continue his mission of spreading the knowledge he had gained in Spain to the Jews throughout the areas he visited and lived. This can be seen particularly in the works he published while living in France. Here, many of the works published can be seen as relating to astrology, and use of the astrolabe.

Influence on biblical criticism and philosophy of religion 
In his commentary, Ibn Ezra adhered to the literal sense of the texts, avoiding Rabbinic allegory and Kabbalistic interpretation. He exercised an independent criticism that, according to some writers, exhibits a marked tendency toward rationalism.

Indeed, Ibn Ezra is claimed by proponents of the higher biblical criticism of the Torah as one of its earliest pioneers. Baruch Spinoza, in concluding that Moses did not author the Torah, and that the Torah and other protocanonical books were written or redacted by somebody else, cites Ibn Ezra commentary on Deuteronomy. In his commentary, Ibn Ezra looks to Deuteronomy 1:1, and is troubled by the anomalous nature of referring to Moses as being "beyond the Jordan", as though the writer was oriented in the land of Cana'an (west of the Jordan River), although Moses and the Children of Israel had not yet crossed the Jordan at that point in the Biblical narrative. Relating this inconsistency to others in the Torah, Ibn Ezra famously stated, "If you can grasp the mystery behind the following problematic passages: 1) The final twelve verses of this book [i.e., Deuteronomy 34:1–12, describing the death of Moses], 2) 'Moshe wrote [this song on the same day, and taught it to the children of Israel]' [Deuteronomy 31:22]; 3) 'At that time, the Canaanites dwelt in the land' [Genesis 12:6]; 4) '... In the mountain of God, He will appear' [Genesis 22:14]; 5) 'behold, his [Og king of Bashan] bed is a bed of iron [is it not in Rabbah of the children of Ammon?]' you will understand the truth."Spinoza concluded that Ibn Ezra's reference to "the truth", and other such references scattered throughout Ibn Ezra's commentary in reference to seemingly anachronistic verses, as "a clear indication that it was not Moses who wrote the Pentateuch but someone else who lived long after him, and that it was a different book that Moses wrote". Spinoza and later scholars were thus able to expand on several of Ibn Ezra's references as a means of providing stronger evidence for Non-Mosaic authorship.

Orthodox writers, on the other hand, have stated that Ibn Ezra's commentary can be interpreted as consistent with Jewish tradition stating that the Torah was divinely dictated to Moses.

Ibn Ezra is also among the first scholars who are known to have published a text about the division of the Book of Isaiah into at least two distinct parts. He remarked in his commentary to Isaiah that chapters 1-39 dealt with a different historical period (second half of the 8th century BCE) than chapters 40-66 (later than last third of the 6th century BCE). This division of the book into First Isaiah and Deutero Isaiah has been accepted nowadays by all but the most conservative Jews and Christians.

Ibn Ezra's commentaries, and especially some of the longer excursuses, contain numerous contributions to the philosophy of religion. One work in particular that belongs to this province, Yesod Mora ("Foundation of Awe"), on the division and the reasons for the Biblical commandments, he wrote in 1158 for a London friend, Joseph ben Jacob. In his philosophical thought neoplatonic ideas prevail; and astrology also had a place in his view of the world. He also wrote various works on mathematical and astronomical subjects.

Bibliography

Biblical commentaries 

 Sefer ha-Yashar ("Book of the Straight") The complete commentary on the Torah, which was finished shortly before his death.

Hebrew grammar 
 Sefer Moznayim  "Book of Scales" (1140), chiefly an explanation of the terms used in Hebrew grammar; as early as 1148 it was incorporated by Judah Hadassi in his Eshkol ha-Kofer, with no mention of Ibn Ezra.
Sefer ha-Yesod, or Yesod Diqduq "Book of Language Fundamentals" (1143)
Sefer Haganah 'al R. Sa'adyah Gaon, (1143) a defense of Saadyah Gaon against Adonim's criticisms.
 Tzakhot (1145), on linguistic correctness, his best grammatical work, which also contains a brief outline of modern Hebrew meter.
 Sefer Safah Berurah "Book of Purified Language" (1146).

Smaller works – partly grammatical, partly exegetical 
 Sefat Yeter, in defense of Saadia Gaon against Dunash ben Labrat, whose criticism of Saadia, Ibn Ezra had brought with him from Egypt.
 Sefer ha-Shem ("Book of the Name"), a work on the names of God.
 Yesod Mispar, a small monograph on numerals.
 Iggeret Shabbat (1158), a responsum on Shabbat

Religious philosophy 
 Yesod Mora Vesod Hatorah (1158), on the division of and reasons for the Biblical commandments.

Mathematics 
 Sefer ha-Ekhad, on the peculiarities of the numbers 1–9.
 Sefer ha-Mispar or Yesod Mispar, arithmetic.
 Luchot, astronomical tables.
 Sefer ha-'Ibbur, on the calendar.
 Keli ha-Nechoshet, on the astrolabe.
 Shalosh She'elot, in answer to three chronological questions of David ben Joseph Narboni.

Astrology 
Ibn Ezra composed his first book on astrology in Italy, before his move to France:
 Mishpetai ha-Mazzelot ("Judgments of the Zodiacal Signs"), on the general principles of astrology

In seven books written in Béziers in 1147–1148 Ibn Ezra then composed a systematic presentation of astrology, starting with an introduction and a book on general principles, and then five books on particular branches of the subject. The presentation appears to have been planned as an integrated whole, with cross-references throughout, including references to subsequent books in the future tense. Each of the books is known in two versions, so it seems that at some point Ibn Ezra also created a revised edition of the series.
 Reshit Hokhma ("The Beginning of Wisdom"), an introduction to astrology, perhaps a revision of his earlier book
 Sefer ha-Te'amim ("Book of Reasons"), an overview of Arabic astrology, giving explanations for the material in the previous book.
 Sefer ha-Moladot ("Book of Nativities"), on astrology based on the time and place of birth.
 Sefer ha-Me'orot ("Book of Luminaries" or "Book of Lights"), on medical astrology.
 Sefer ha-She'elot ("Book of Interrogations"), on questions about particular events.
 Sefer ha-Mivharim ("Book of Elections", also known as "Critical Days"), on optimum days for particular activities.
 Sefer ha-Olam ("Book of the World"), on the fates of countries and wars, and other larger-scale issues.
 Translation of two works by the astrologer Mashallah ibn Athari: "She'elot" and "Qadrut".

Poetry 
There are a great many other poems by Ibn Ezra, some of them religious and some secular – about friendship, wine, didactic or satirical. Like his friend Yehuda Halevi, he used the Arabic poetic form of Muwashshah. His relative Moses ibn Ezra was also a famous poet.

Legacy 
The crater Abenezra on the Moon was named in honor of Ibn Ezra.

Robert Browning's poem "Rabbi Ben Ezra", beginning "Grow old along with me/The best is yet to be", is derived from a meditation on Ibn Ezra's life and work which appeared in Browning's 1864 Dramatis Personae.

See also 
 Rabbinic literature
 List of rabbis
 Jewish views of astrology
 Jewish commentaries on the Bible
 Kabbalistic astrology
 Astrology in Judaism
 Hebrew astronomy
 Islamic astrology
Abenezra (crater)

References

Further reading
 Carmi, T. (ed.), The Penguin book of Hebrew verse, Penguin Classics, 2006, London 
 Charlap, Luba. 2001. Another view of Rabbi Abraham Ibn-Ezra's  contribution to medieval Hebrew grammar. Hebrew Studies 42:67-80.
 Epstein, Meira, "Rabbi Avraham Ibn Ezra" – An article by Meira Epstein, detailing all of ibn Ezra's extant astrological works
 Glick, Thomas F.; Livesey, Steven John; and Wallis, Faith, Medieval Science, Technology, and Medicine: An Encyclopedia, Routledge, 2005. . Cf. pp. 247–250.
 Goodman, Mordechai S. (Translator), The Sabbath Epistle of Rabbi Abraham Ibn Ezra,('iggeret hashabbat). Ktav Publishing House, Inc., New Jersey (2009). 
 Halbronn, Jacques, Le monde juif et l'astrologie, Ed Arché, Milan, 1985
 Halbronn, Jacques, Le livre des fondements astrologiques, précédé du Commencement de la Sapience des Signes, Pref. G. Vajda, Paris, ed Retz 1977
 Holden, James H., History of Horoscopic Astrology, American Federation of Astrologers, 2006. . Cf. pp. 132–135.
 Jewish Virtual Library, Abraham Ibn Ezra
 Johansson, Nadja, Religion and Science in Abraham Ibn Ezra's Sefer Ha-Olam (Including an English Translation of the Hebrew Text)
 Langermann, Tzvi, "Abraham Ibn Ezra", Stanford Encyclopedia of Philosophy, 2006. Accessed June 21, 2011.
Levin, Elizabetha, Various Times in Abraham Ibn Ezra’s Works and their Reflection in Modern Thought // KronoScope, Brill Academic Publishers,18, Issue 2, 2018, pp. 154-170. DOI: 10.1163/15685241-12341414
 Levine, Etan. Ed., Abraham ibn Ezra's Commentary to the Pentateuch, Vatican Manuscript Vat. Ebr. 38. Jerusalem: Makor, 1974.
 Sánchez-Rubio García, Fernando (2016). El segundo comentario de Abraham Ibn Ezra al libro del Cantar de los Cantares. Edición crítica, traducción, notas y estudio introductorio. Tesis doctoral (UCM)
 Sela, Shlomo, "Abraham Ibn Ezra's Scientific Corpus Basic Constituents and General Characterization", in Arabic Sciences and Philosophy, (2001), 11:1:91–149 Cambridge University Press
 Sela, Shlomo, Abraham Ibn Ezra and the Rise of Medieval Hebrew Science, Brill, 2003. 
 Siegel, Eliezer, Rabbi Abraham Ibn Ezra's Commentary to the Torah
 skyscript.co.uk, 120 Aphorisms for Astrologers by Abraham ibn Ezra
 skyscript.co.uk, Skyscript: The Life and Work of Abraham Ibn Ezra
 Smithuis, Renate,  "Abraham Ibn Ezra's Astrological Works in Hebrew and Latin: New Discoveries and Exhaustive Listing", in Aleph (Aleph: Historical Studies in Science and Judaism), 2006, No. 6, Pages 239-338
 Wacks, David. "The Poet, the Rabbi, and the Song: Abraham ibn Ezra and the Song of Songs". Wine, Women, and Song: Hebrew and Arabic Literature in Medieval Iberia. Eds. Michelle M. Hamilton, Sarah J. Portnoy and David A. Wacks. Newark, Del.: Juan de la Cuesta Hispanic Monographs, 2004. 47–58.
 Walfish, Barry, "The Two Commentaries of Abraham Ibn Ezra on the Book of Esther", The Jewish Quarterly Review, New Series, Vol. 79, No. 4 (April 1989), pp. 323–343, University of Pennsylvania Press

External links 

 Encyclopaedia Judaica (2007) entry on "Ibn Ezra, Abraham Ben Meir" with extensive bibliography by Uriel Simon and Raphael Jospe
  
 
 
Commentaries over the Torah at Sefaria
 Poems in Hebrew at Ben Yehuda Project

1080s births
1167 deaths
People from Tudela, Navarre
Bible commentators
Jewish poets
12th-century rabbis in al-Andalus
Medieval Hebraists
Medieval Jewish astrologers
Astrologers from Al-Andalus
Medieval Navarrese Jews
Philosophers of Judaism
Sephardi rabbis
Grammarians of Hebrew
Jewish astronomers